Lucky's Collectors Guide to 20th Century Yo-Yos is a catalog of yo-yos manufactured largely in the United States from the twentieth century. Produced by Lucky Meisenheimer, M.D., the Guinness World Record holder for the largest Yo-yo collection, the book features the history of the yo-yo as well as a price guide.  Over one thousand photographs of yo-yos and memorabilia are listed in the book.  Collectors frequently use his numbering system to identify particular yo-yos.

A first edition copy of this book is included in the Smithsonian Institution collection donated by Don Duncan Jr.

References

External links
 http://www.yo-yos.net

1999 non-fiction books